"If I Knew Then" is a 1939 song written by Dick Jurgens and Eddy Howard, and performed by Jurgens' big band with Howard singing. Their version charted briefly in 1939.
Bing Crosby recorded the song on February 9, 1940 with John Scott Trotter and His Orchestra.  It was also covered by Johnny Mercer and his Pied Pipers (1945), Sammy Kaye and his Orchestra, Sarah Vaughan on Sarah Vaughan with Clifford Brown and Swingin' Easy, Val Doonican (1968) and many others.

References

1939 songs
Eddy Howard songs